Zhang Dai (張岱; pinyin: Zhāng Dài, courtesy name: Zongzi (宗子), pseudonym: Tao'an (陶庵)) (1597–1684) was a Chinese essayist and historian. He was a gentleman essayist who was a biographer of his own privileged aristocratic family, a historian of the Ming Dynasty, and a biographer of notable virtuous figures. He wrote his own obituary which included the lines : He loved pretty maidservants, he  loved handsome serving boys . . . he loved perfect food . . . he loved  paintings of flowers and birds.

Zhang was a prolific writer, having penned more than thirty books covering literature and history; however only a few of Zhang's numerous works remain extant today.

Zhang Dai's most famous books are:

 Tao An Meng Yi (陶庵夢憶 Reminiscences in Dreams of Tao An),  written ca. 1665.
 Xi Hu Meng Xun (西湖夢尋 Search The West Lake in Dreams)

Life 

Zhang Dai was born in Ming Dynasty Wanli 25th year (1597 AD) in Shanyin (山陰), now Shaoxing of Zhejiang province, China. His ancestors came from Sichuan

Zhang Dai never passed the Imperial examinations which led to the Ming civil service, instead he became a private scholar and aesthete. His family's wealth allowed him to develop his aesthetic tastes in such pursuits as Moon watching festivals, Chinese lantern design, the sponsorship of dramatic troupes, appreciation of tea, and garden and landscape aesthetics. His writing tries to convey the sensuality and subtlety of these pursuits.

His inwardly focused mind did not see the coming collapse of the Ming in 1644–1645. When anarchy and war broke over his beloved landscape in the Yangtze delta he was forced to flee to the mountains where he hid as a Buddhist monk. When he returned in 1649 all his property was gone and he lived as a tenant in the ruins of one of his beloved gardens. It was here he completed his history of the Ming Dynasty, in part to explain its collapse.

For a period of time, he was the sole source of income for more than 20 of his family members. Hard physical works became a part of his daily routine. However, this time period and his culmination of literary production overlapped.

He died in 1684 around the age of 88.

Works by Zhang Dai 
Zhang Dai was a prolific writer/author. By the age of 50, he had completed more than ten literary works. During his later years, nothing prevented him from writing more on what he found to be a worthy subject. He was a notable author of the xiaopin, a form of short literary essay.

Notable works:
張岱 Zhang Dai: 陶庵夢憶 Tao An Meng Yi, 1986 edition, Golden Maple Publishing House, Taiwan
張岱 Zhang Dai: 西湖夢尋 Xi Hu Meng Xun, Search The West Lake in Dreams. 

Full list:
The Biographies of Five Unusual People – Eight biographies of distant family members.
Book of the Stone Casket – History of the Ming Dynasty completed in the 1670s.
Historical Gaps – Study of deliberate omissions in Chinese history
The Night Ferry 夜航船 – A Compendium of Knowledge to aid conversations between strangers
Portraits with Commentary of the Imperishable Worthies of the Shaoxing Region in the Ming – (with Xu Quin) Collection of portraits of worthy figures – incomplete.
Profiles of Righteous and Honorable People Through the Ages – Collection of 400 compact biographical studies of worthy people from the second millennium BC to the 1360s.
Sequel to the Book of the Stone Casket – Describing the fall of the Ming dynasty and apportioning blame.
Tracing Westlake in a Dream 西湖夢尋 – Memories of his beloved  West Lake in the city of Hangzhou. A beautiful lake surrounded by villas and gardens, later destroyed in the war following the fall of the Ming.
The Dream Recollections of Taoan 陶庵夢憶 – Flashes of memories of his earlier life that came to Zhang Dai whilst in hiding as a Taoist monk following the fall of the Ming.
Langhuan Wenji 嫏嬛文集 – The Paradise of Langhuan. Description of an imagined landscape of gardens, lakes, rivers, trees, mountain views, shrines, and halls.
The Lean Nags of Yangzhou 揚州瘦馬 – On the concubine market in the town of Yangzhou.
On Matteo Ricco – Comments on the Chinese work of a westerner, the  Jesuit Matteo Ricci.
On Putuo Shrine – Essay on his journey to the island of Putuo, one of the most sacred Buddhist sites in China.
"Rhyme Mountain" - Reflections on the unpublished work of his grandfather.
Letter to the Prince of Lu – Letter to the leader of the southern Ming known as the Prince of Lu following the fall of the dynasty, encouraging him to restore the dynasty to China.
Ice Mountain 冰山 – Operatic play about the rise and fall of the eunuch Wei Zhongxian.
 Self Written Obituary

Poems:
For Dr Lu
For the Singer Courtesan Wang Yuesheng
New Year's Day
 Pounding Rice
 For Qi Biaojia
Rebuttal of Qi Biaojia

Books on Zhang Dai 
 Spence, Jonathan D. (2007). Return to Dragon Mountain: Memories of a Late Ming Man. Viking, 332 pages. 
 Kafalas, Phlip A. (2007). In Limpid Dream: Nostalgia and Zhang Dai's Reminiscences of the Ming. East Bridge, 286 pages.

Translations 
 Zhang Dai, Souvenirs rêvés de Tao'an, translated by Brigitte Teboul-Wang, 1995
 Vignettes from the Late Ming: A Hsiao-P'in Anthology, by Yang Ye, University of Washington Press; (March 1999)

Excerpt 
Elderly Min Tea 閔老子茶
Chou Me-Nong bragged about Min Vin-sui's tea to me over and over. In the ninth month of 1638, I went to the City of Liu. After landing, I visited Min Vin-sui at Peach Leave Ferry. It was afternoon, and Vin-sui was out. He came back late, and I saw a grumpy old man. No sooner than introduction, he suddenly exclaimed "I forgot my cane at some one's home !" then out he went. I said to myself " I cannot afford to waste a whole day". I called again. When Vin-sui returned, it was already evening. He glanced at me, and said "Is the guest still here ? What are you here for?" "I have long heard your reputation, I will not leave here unless I get to drink Vin-sui tea" I replied.
Vin-sui was pleased, and set up stove and brew tea himself, as swiftly as wind and storm. He led me into a room with bright windows and clean desk and filled with Thorn Brook tea pots and Chen Shuen Kiln porcelain cups. What an exquisite collection! Under the lamplight, the color of tea looked the same as the porcelain cups, but the tea had an aggressive aroma, I exclaimed with amazement and ask Vin-sui "Where do you obtained this tea?" "It was from the Garden of Liang" he replied. I sipped again, and said "Don't fool me, this tea was indeed made according to Liang Garden recipe, but it doesn't tasted so" "Do you know where the tea was from?" asked
Vin-sui, hiding his smile. I sipped again, and said "How come it tasted so much like Lu Gie tea?" "Odd, odd!" said Vin-sui, sticking out his tongue. I ask Vin-sui what kind of water he used. "Hui Spring water" "Don't fool me, Hui Spring water travelled thousands of miles how come the water moves but not the pebbles?" "I am not going to hide the truth any more. When one fetch Hui Spring water one must dig a well, and wait in a silent night for new water to arrive, then bucket it up quickly. Mountain pebbles would line the bottom of the jar. A boat will not move without the wind, so still water creates no pebbles......" " Odd, odd!" said he, sticking out his tongue. No sooner he uttered this words, out he went. He soon returned with a kettle and pour me a full cup of tea, and said "please try this" "It has an intense aroma and rich taste. Is this spring tea? The one I tasted before was Autumn pick" Vin-sui laughed heartily and said "In seventy years of my life, I have never met a single connoisseur like you!" We became friends. 

From Book III, "Dream and Remininscence of Tao An", translated by Gisling

References

Bibliography 
 Mair, Victor H. (ed.) (2001). The Columbia History of Chinese Literature. New York: Columbia University Press. . (Amazon Kindle edition.)

External links 
 
 

1597 births
1689 deaths
17th-century Chinese historians
Historians from Zhejiang
Ming dynasty essayists
Ming dynasty historians
Writers from Shaoxing